In a Roman Osteria is an 1866 oil on canvas painting by the Danish painter Carl Bloch. It was painted in 1866. One of Bloch's better-known genre scenes, the painting was commissioned by the merchant Moritz G. Melchior, Bloch's friend and major supporter who is included in the background of the painting.

History

Carl Bloch was a personal friend of Moritz G. Melchior. He often visited the Melchior family for dinner on Thursdays in their home on the second floor at Højbro Plads 21. Other friends of the family, who would often also attend the Thursday Dinners, included the writer Hans Christian Andersen and the painter Frederik Christian Lund, poet and museum administrator Carl Andersen and representatives of the press such as Dagbladet editor C. St. A. Bille, journalists Robert Watt and P. "Cabiro" Hansen and publisher and editor of Fædrelandet ('The Fatherland') Carl Ploug.

Melchior commissioned the painting from Bloch in connection with a journey to Italy. He requested a painting similar to that of Wilhelm Marstrand's Italian Osteria Scene, Girl welcoming a Person entering (1847).

The Polish-Danish painter Elisabeth Jerichau Baumann also made a version of the scene and there are at least three variations of that painting. The unframed oil on canvas measures .

In 1884, Melchior bequeathed the painting to the Danish National Gallery. It was handed over to the museum following the death of Melchior's daughter Louise in 1935.

Description
The setting is in the interior of a Roman osteria. In the forefront, there is a table with three customers: a young man is facing two young women. The one on the left of the man wears a headscarf in the typical garb of married Roman women at the time. The man is seen turning toward the onlooker with an angry expression, whereas the woman at his left is looking with a smiling one, and the (presumably slightly older) other woman looks amused in the same direction.

The painter is shown sitting in an osteria, at a table talking with his friends. The two figures sitting beside him are depicted, the figure turning his back to the viewers is the painter himself.

In popular culture
In April 2018, BBC Radio 1 DJ Greg James led a real-life recreation of the painting after his listeners discovered that he looked like the man in the painting. It was called the 'Radio 1 Paint-A-Long' and also included two listeners, Miriam and Harriet, who took the places of the women featured.

References

External links

Zoomable version 

1866 paintings
Danish paintings
Cats in art
Paintings in the collection of the National Gallery of Denmark
Food and drink paintings